ALAS (Fundación América Latina en Acción Solidaria) is a non-profit with the intent to launch a new social movement for a collective commitment to comprehensive Early Childhood Development programs in Latin America.

ALAS was founded by Colombian singer and UNICEF ambassador Shakira, and its Honorary President is Nobel laureate Gabriel García Márquez. 

Notable members of ALAS include latinx artists Juanes, Alejandro Sanz, and Miguel Bosé.

Concerts

On 17 May 2008, for the first time, two concerts were held simultaneously in Argentina and Mexico. Shakira, Alejandro Sanz, Calle 13, Paulina Rubio, Gustavo Cerati and others artists performed in Buenos Aires, where 150 thousand people gathered. 

In Mexico City, Miguel Bosé, Ricky Martin, Chayanne, Lucero and Diego Torres were some of the artists on the stage list. Juanes did not participate in either concert. The concert in Mexico was attended by approximately 200 thousand people. Both concerts were completely free and their only goal was to make the public aware of the problems around poverty of Latin-American children.

Controversy 
In response to allegations of mismanagement, Antonio de la Rúa, one the organization's Vice Presidents, denied the claims, and explained that there was no evidence of mismanagement, nor a reason for the recent exodus of many of the members.

ALAS – IDB Award 
The ALAS – IDB Award was created in 2011 jointly by  the Inter-American Development Bank (IADB) and the ALAS Foundation to recognize "high quality, suitable intensity and length programs and interventions that combine early education, psychosocial stimulation, nutrition, health and works with the family".

Award Categories  
 Best Center
 Best Educator
 Best Publication
 Best Innovation

Footnotes

External links
 ALAS Foundation's Website
ALAS Founder Shakira's Pies Descalzos Foundation
 The ALAS Foundation Press Release (2006-12-12). "The ALAS Foundation Is Born: America Latina en Accion Solidaria". Retrieved on 2009-06-07.
 Juanita Samper Ospina (2009-03-11). "Colombiano por adopción, involucrado en escándalo de corrupción en el Partido Popular español". eltiempo.com. Retrieved on 2009-06-07.
 Mónica Palm (2009-03-10). "Directivos de Alas, en trama de corrupción en España"  prensa.com. Retrieved 2009-06-07.
 Gastón Rodriguez (2009-04-17). "La última trampa de Antonito". elargentino.com. Retrieved on 2009-06-07.
 Brenda Yastremiz (2009-05-10). "Protagonistas: Antonio de la Rúa". perfil.com. Retrieved on 2009-06-07.

Child-related organisations in Colombia
Early childhood educational organizations